Kostiantyn Shkolniy (born 3 February 1961) is a Ukrainian archer. He competed in the men's individual and team events at the 1988 Summer Olympics.

References

1961 births
Living people
Ukrainian male archers
Olympic archers of the Soviet Union
Archers at the 1988 Summer Olympics
Sportspeople from Lviv